Gomer was the son of Japheth in the Hebrew Bible.

Gomer may also refer to:

Places
Gomer, Armenia, a town
Gomer, Pyrénées-Atlantiques, France, a commune
Gomer, Ohio, U.S., an unincorporated community
Gomer Township, Caldwell County, Missouri, U.S.
Fort Gomer, a former fort in Gosport, England

Arts and entertainment
Gomer Pyle, a fictional character from the American TV sitcoms The Andy Griffith Show and Gomer Pyle, U.S.M.C.
Gomer Goof, English name of the title character of the French comic strip Gaston
The Gomers, an American rock band
Gomers, slang term for fans of the Christian rock band Third Day

People
Gomer (name), a list of people with the given name or surname
Gomer (wife of Hosea), from the Hebrew Bible
Harold Gomer Hodge (1944–2007), American Major League Baseball player and minor league manager and instructor
Joseph Harris (Gomer) (1773–1825), Welsh minister, author and publisher known by the pseudonym "Gomer"

Other uses
"Get Out of My Emergency Room" (GOMER), a medical abbreviation for a patient in the emergency room who does not require emergency care
French frigate Gomer (1841)
Gomer Press, a printing and publishing company in Wales
Gomer (animal), a male livestock animal whose penis has been surgically altered to prevent sexual intercourse

See also
Gomera (disambiguation)